Sean Richardson (born August 28, 1973) is a former professional rugby league footballer who played in the 1990s and 2000s. He also plays for Rugby Union side Liverpool St.Helens

First Division Grand Final appearances
Sean Richardson was an  interchange/substitute in Wakefield Trinity's 24-22 victory over Featherstone Rovers in the 1998 First Division Grand Final at McAlpine Stadium, Huddersfield on 26 September 1998.

References

External links
Statistics at rugbyleagueproject.org
Statistics at thecastlefordtigers.co.uk
Statistics at rugby.widnes.tv
Bulls stave off gutsy Vikings
Vikings face Hull challenge
Richardson out of season finale
Wolves go for Grose
Leigh crush Moscow minnows
Beware the rampaging Bulls
Widnes Vikings
Reds go top
Salford back in top flight
Sculthorpe out for Wigan

Batley Bulldogs players
Castleford Tigers players
Dewsbury Rams players
English rugby league players
Featherstone Rovers players
Leigh Leopards players
Living people
Place of birth missing (living people)
Rugby league locks
Rugby league second-rows
Wakefield Trinity players
Widnes Vikings players
1973 births